Joseph Edward Mayer (February 5, 1904, New York City – October 15, 1983) was a chemist who formulated the Mayer expansion in statistical field theory.

He was professor of chemistry at the University of California San Diego from 1960 to 1972, and previously at Johns Hopkins University, Columbia University and the University of Chicago. He was married to Nobel Prize-winning physicist Maria Goeppert Mayer from 1930 until her death in 1972. He went to work with James Franck in Göttingen, Germany in 1929, where he met Maria, a student of Max Born. He was a member of the United States National Academy of Sciences (1946), the American Academy of Arts and Sciences (1958), and the American Philosophical Society (1970). Joseph Mayer was president of the American Physical Society from 1973 to 1975.

Scientific contributions
He developed the cluster expansion method and Mayer-McMillan solution theory.

See also
Mayer f-function

References

Further reading

External links
Joseph Mayer Papers MSS 0047. Special Collections & Archives, UC San Diego Library.

–

20th-century American chemists
University of California, San Diego faculty
University of Chicago faculty
Scientists from New York City
1904 births
1983 deaths
The Journal of Chemical Physics editors
Members of the American Philosophical Society
Presidents of the American Physical Society